Maria Berger (born 19 August 1956 in Perg, Upper Austria) is an Austrian politician and currently Judge at the European Court of Justice. She previously served as a Member of the European Parliament and Austria's Minister of Justice.

Education
 Doctor of Law, Innsbruck University (1979)

Early career
 University assistant (1979–1984)
 Official at the Federal Ministry of Science and Research (1984–1988)
 Head of the European Integration Department of the Federal Chancellor's Office (1989–1993)
 Directorship post in the EFTA Surveillance Authority in Brussels (1993–1994)
 Vice-President of the University of Krems (1995–1996)
 Federal Chairman of the Young Generation in the SPÖ (1984–1987)
 Member of the Land party committee of the SPÖ in Upper Austria (since 2004)

Political career
Berger was a Member of the European Parliament since 1996, interrupted by her tenure as Austrian Justice Minister (20072008). She was also the leader of the Social Democratic Party delegation  which is part of the Party of European Socialists, and served on the European Parliament's Committee on Legal Affairs. On the committee, she served as her parliamentary group’s coordinator. In addition, she later also was a member of the Committee on the Environment, Public Health and Food Safety and the parliament’s delegation to the ACP–EU Joint Parliamentary Assembly.

Berger was also a substitute for the Committee on Constitutional Affairs, a member of the delegation for relations with the countries of South Asia and the South Asian Association for Regional Cooperation, and a substitute for the delegation for relations with Canada. 

In January 2007 Berger was appointed as Justice Minister in the government of Alfred Gusenbauer as Chancellor of Austria. After leaving office in December 2008 she returned to serve in the European Parliament till July 2009. Since October 2009 she is a member of the European Court of Justice.

Recognition
 Honorary medal of the International Mauthausen Committee, National Order of the Republic of Lithuania

See also
 List of members of the European Court of Justice

References

External links
 European Parliament biography
 Declaration of financial interests (in German; PDF file)

1956 births
Living people
People from Perg District
Justice ministers of Austria
Social Democratic Party of Austria MEPs
MEPs for Austria 1999–2004
MEPs for Austria 2004–2009
MEPs for Austria 1996–1999
European Court of Justice judges
Austrian judges
Austrian women judges
20th-century women MEPs for Austria
21st-century women MEPs for Austria
Women government ministers of Austria
Austrian judges of international courts and tribunals
Female justice ministers